

This is a list of the National Register of Historic Places listings in Westmoreland County, Pennsylvania.

This is intended to be a complete list of the properties and districts on the National Register of Historic Places in Westmoreland County, Pennsylvania, United States. The locations of National Register properties and districts for which the latitude and longitude coordinates are included below, may be seen in a map.

There are 54 properties and districts listed on the National Register in the county. One site is further designated as a National Historic Landmark.  Another property was once listed but has been removed.

Current listings

|}

Former listing

|}

See also

 List of Pennsylvania state historical markers in Westmoreland County

References

 
Westmoreland County